In Greek mythology, Arcadia (Ancient Greek: Ἀρκαδία) may refer to the following personages:

 Arcadia or Arcania, was one of the Danaides, daughters of King Danaos of Libya and later of Argos. She married and killed her groom, Xanthus, son of Aegyptus, king of Egypt.
 Arcadia, wife Nyctimus, son of the impious Lycaon, and became the mother of a daughter Phylonome who consorted with Ares.

Notes

References 

 Gaius Julius Hyginus, Fabulae from The Myths of Hyginus translated and edited by Mary Grant. University of Kansas Publications in Humanistic Studies. Online version at the Topos Text Project.
Lucius Mestrius Plutarchus, Moralia with an English Translation by Frank Cole Babbitt. Cambridge, MA. Harvard University Press. London. William Heinemann Ltd. 1936. Online version at the Perseus Digital Library. Greek text available from the same website.

Women in Greek mythology
Characters in Greek mythology
Arcadian mythology